Oxidization may refer to:

 Oxidation, a chemical reaction in which electrons are lost
 Beta oxidation, the process by which fatty acids are broken down in mitochondria and/or peroxisomes
 Rust